Buckhead may refer to several places in the U.S. state of Georgia:

Buckhead, a district in Atlanta
Buckhead, Bryan County, Georgia, a census-designated place
Buckhead, Morgan County, Georgia, an incorporated town